Thiodia lerneana is a species of moth of the family Tortricidae. It is found in Spain, France, Austria, Italy, Bulgaria, Romania, Lithuania, Russia, Transural, Kazakhstan, Turkmenistan and Kyrgyzstan.

The wingspan is 14–18 mm. Adults have been recorded on wing in June.

References

Moths described in 1835
Eucosmini